Suplee is an unincorporated community in Honey Brook Township in Chester County, Pennsylvania, United States. Suplee is located along Suplee Road east of Honey Brook.

References

Unincorporated communities in Chester County, Pennsylvania
Unincorporated communities in Pennsylvania